UVSE is a water polo club from Budapest, Hungary, founded in 2008. It was split off from Újpesti TE, which afterwards folded. They have teams in the men's and women's Hungarian First Division. The women have won the 2014–15 and the 2015–16 competition.

Honours (women's team)
 Euroleague
 Runner up (1): 2016

 LEN Trophy
 Champion (1): 2017
 Runner up (1): 2019

 Hungarian Nationwide Championship (5)
 2015, 2016, 2017, 2018, 2019

 Hungarian Cup (5)
 2014, 2015, 2016, 2017, 2018

Notes

External links
Official website 

Water polo clubs in Hungary
Sport in Budapest
2008 establishments in Hungary
Sports clubs established in 2008